Ortlund is a surname. Notable people with the surname include:

 Raymond C. Ortlund Sr. (1923–2007), American Presbyterian minister
 Raymond C. Ortlund Jr., American Presbyterian minister

See also
 Ostlund